Claudine Doury (born 1959) is a French photographer living in Paris. She has been a member of Agence Vu since 1991. In 1999, she received the Leica Oskar Barnack award as well as a World Press Photo award for her work on the "Peoples of Siberia", and the Niépce Prize in 2004. Her Siberian work has been shown in a solo exhibition at the Académie des Beaux-Arts in Paris.

Life and work
Doury was born in 1959 in Blois, France.

Her work deals with the notions of memory, transition and passage, particularly around adolescence and travel, central themes in her work.

In 2006, she exhibited Beyond the Steppes at Rencontres d'Arles.

Doury has been a member of Agence Vu since 1991.

Publications

Publications by Doury
Peuples de Sibérie: Du fleuve Amour aux terres boréales. Seuil, 1999. . With a preface by Christian Caujolle and an essay by Jean-Pierre Thibaudat.
Artek, un été en Crimée. La Martinière, 2004. . With a preface by Christian Caujolle.
Loulan Beauty. Chêne, 2007. .
Sasha. Caillou Bleu, 2011. . With essays by Christian Caujolle and Melanie McWhorter.
L'homme nouveau. Filigranes, 2017 .
Amour. Chose Commune, 2020. .

Publications with contributions by Doury
Regards sur le Monde: les Visages de la Faim. Acropole Belfont, 2004. .
Misère Urbaine: La Faim Cachée. Au Diable Vauvert, 2006. .

Awards 
 1999: Leica Oskar Barnack award
 1999: World Press Photo 2000
 2004: Niépce Prize, for Artek, un été en Crimée

Solo exhibitions
Une odyssée sibérienne = A Siberian Odyssey, Académie des Beaux-Arts, Paris, 2018

References

External links
 
 Doury's page at Agence VU

1959 births
Living people
French photographers
Artists from Blois
French women photographers